Badwell may refer to the following places in Suffolk, England:

 Badwell Ash
 Badwell Green